Blakley is an English surname. Notable people with the surname include:

Alan Blakley (1942–1996), English guitarist and record producer
Claudie Blakley (born 1974), English actor
Dwayne Blakley (born 1979), American football player
George Blakley, American cryptographer and mathematician
Lin Blakley (born 1948), British actress
Ronee Blakley (born 1945), American actress and singer
Sherry Blakley (1962–2011), American racing driver
William A. Blakley (1898–1976), American politician and businessman

See also
Blakeley (disambiguation)

English-language surnames